Siah Pelah or Siah Peleh may refer to:

Siah Peleh-ye Olya
Siah Pelah-ye Ommid Olya
Siah Peleh-ye Sofla, Kermanshah